In basketball, an illegal dribble (colloquially called a double dribble or dribbling violation) occurs when a player ends their dribble by catching or causing the ball to come to rest in one or both hands and then dribbles it again with one hand or when a player touches it before the ball hits the ground. The dribble also ends when the dribbler palms/carries the ball by allowing it to come to rest in one or both hands. This is a palming/carrying the ball violation if the player continues with another dribble.

There is no violation during the jump ball, a throw-in or a free throw.

Official NBA rules
In the National Basketball Association, a dribble is movement of the ball, caused by a player in control, who throws or touches the ball into the air or to the floor.

The dribble ends when the player: 
 Touches the ball simultaneously with both hands.
 Permits the ball to come to rest while the player is in control of it.
 Touches the ball more than once while dribbling, before it touches the floor.

FIBA rule
Art. 24.2 of the FIBA rules  provides that:

A player shall not dribble for a second time after his first dribble has ended unless
between the two dribbles he has lost control of a live ball on the playing court because
of:
 A shot for a field goal.
 A touch of the ball by an opponent.
 A pass or fumble that has touched or been touched by another player.

Penalty
Under NCAA, NFHS and FIBA rules, if an illegal dribble violation occurs, then the ball is awarded to the opposing team out of bounds nearest the point where the violation took place. Under NBA rules, the ball is awarded to the opposing team at the nearest spot, but no closer to the end line than the free throw line extended.

See also

 Carrying (basketball), dribbling by placing the hand palm up under the ball while dribbling.

References

Basketball penalties